Hilary Ann Priestley is a British mathematician.  She is a professor at the University of Oxford and a Fellow of St Anne's College, Oxford, where she has been Tutor in Mathematics since 1972.

Hilary Priestley introduced ordered separable topological spaces; such topological spaces are now usually called Priestley spaces in her honour. The term "Priestley duality" is also used for her application of these spaces in the representation theory of distributive lattices.

Books

References

External links
 Hilary Priestley home page
 Professor Hilary Priestley profile at the Mathematical Institute, University of Oxford
 Professor Hilary Ann Priestley profile at St Anne's College, Oxford
 Hilary Priestley on ResearchGate

Year of birth missing (living people)
Living people
Place of birth missing (living people)
Alumni of the University of Oxford
British women mathematicians
20th-century English mathematicians
21st-century English mathematicians
Algebraists
Lattice theorists
Fellows of St Anne's College, Oxford
20th-century women mathematicians
21st-century women mathematicians